Schistura huongensis is a species of ray-finned fish in the most speciose genus of the stone loach family Nemacheilidae, Schistura. It has been recorded from the drainage basins of the Perfume River and Cam Lo in central Vietnam. It can be found in the slack water upstream of riffles in medium-sized mountain rivers and streams with a fast current.

References 

H
Cyprinid fish of Asia
Endemic fauna of Vietnam
Fish of Vietnam
Freshwater fish of Asia
Fish described in 2001
Taxa named by Jörg Freyhof